The 2019 International Champions Cup was the seventh edition of the International Champions Cup (ICC), a series of association football friendly matches. The competition was won by Portuguese club Benfica.

Teams
A total of 12 teams participated in the competition. On June 12, Fiorentina replaced Roma due to Roma's impending participation in UEFA Europa League qualifiers (which they did not end up playing in).

Venues
17 venues for the International Champions Cup were announced on March 26, 2019.

Matches
The match schedule was announced on March 28, 2019, and was updated on June 12 after Fiorentina replaced Roma. Each team played three matches, for a total of 18 matches.

Table
The 12 teams were ranked based on results from their three matches, with the best-ranked team being crowned champions. In addition to three points for a win and none for a loss, a penalty shoot-out win was worth two points, while a loss on penalties earned one point.

Media coverage 
All 18 matches were live streamed for the unsold markets and highlights were also available for all territories around the world via ICC's official websites. The rights may be including both the 2019 International Leagues Cup (La Liga-Serie A cup) matches depending on the broadcasters.

See also 

 2019 Women's International Champions Cup
 2019 La Liga-Serie A Cup

References

External links

2019
2019 in American soccer
2019 in Chinese football
2019–20 in English football
2019 in Singaporean football
2019 in Swedish football
2019–20 in Welsh football
July 2019 sports events in Asia
July 2019 sports events in China
July 2019 sports events in the United States
August 2019 sports events in Europe
August 2019 sports events in the United Kingdom